The Northern Pacific Warehouse in Thompson Falls, Montana, also known as the Burlington Northern Warehouse, was built in 1900 and was listed on the National Register of Historic Places in 1986.

The listed property is bounded by Preston Ave. and Main St. along the Burlington Northern right-of-way.

It was deemed significant as the sole surviving structure from the railroad industry in Thompson Falls.

References

National Register of Historic Places in Sanders County, Montana
Commercial buildings completed in 1900
Warehouses on the National Register of Historic Places
Northern Pacific Railway
Railway buildings and structures on the National Register of Historic Places in Montana
1900 establishments in Montana
Thompson Falls, Montana